St Austell Bay was an electoral division of Cornwall in the United Kingdom which returned one member to sit on Cornwall Council between 2009 and 2021. It was abolished at the 2021 local elections, being succeeded by Mevagissey and St Austell Bay.

Councillors

Extent
St Austell Bay represented the south east of the town of St Austell, including Carlyon Bay, the suburb of Holmbush and part of the suburb of Sandy Bottom (which was shared with the Mount Charles division), as well as the villages of Higher Porthpean and Charlestown, and the hamlets of Lower Porthpean, Trenarren and Tregrehan Mills. Duporth was shared with the Mevagissey division. The division was affected by boundary changes at the 2013 election. From 2009 to 2013, the division covered 610 hectares in total; after the boundary changes in 2013, it covered 881 hectares.

Election results

2017 election

2013 election

2009 election

References

St Austell
Electoral divisions of Cornwall Council